Karen Elisabeth O'Brien  is a British academic administrator and scholar of English literature, specialising in the Enlightenment and eighteenth-century literature. Since 2022, she has been Vice-Chancellor and Warden of Durham University (the first woman to hold the office), having previously been Professor of English Literature and Head of the Humanities Division, University of Oxford, and a Fellow of University College, Oxford.

Prior to her time at Oxford, she was a pro-vice-chancellor at the University of Birmingham and then Vice-Principal for Education at King's College London. O'Brien's scholarly work focuses on the British, American and French Enlightenments, and on British literature more generally between 1660 and 1820. She was awarded her doctoral degree (DPhil) by St Cross College, Oxford in 1986 for a thesis on English, after having completed her undergraduate studies at University College.  She is a Fellow of the Royal Society of Arts, and an Honorary Fellow of Peterhouse, Cambridge.

Selected works

References

Academics of the University of Oxford
Fellows of University College, Oxford
Academics of King's College London
Academics of the University of Birmingham
British academics of English literature
Intellectual historians
Vice-Chancellors and Wardens of Durham University
British literary historians
British academic administrators
Year of birth missing (living people)
Living people